Adenocaulon is a small genus of flowering plants in the family daisy family known generally as trailplants.  It was first described in 1829.

The genus is native to the Americas and Asia.

 Species
 Adenocaulon bicolor Hook. - United States (MI WI SD WY MT ID WA OR CA), Canada (Ont Alb BC)
 Adenocaulon chilense Less. - Chile, Argentina
 Adenocaulon himalaicum Edgew. - China, India, Japan, Korea, Nepal, Russia
 Adenocaulon lyratum S.F.Blake - Guatemala, Chiapas
 Adenocaulon nepalense Bittmann - Nepal

References

External links
 
 Jepson Manual Treatment

Mutisieae
Asteraceae genera